The 1962 Southern Miss Southerners football team was an American football team that represented the University of Southern Mississippi as an independent during the 1962 NCAA College Division football season. In its 14th season under head coach Thad Vann, the team compiled a 9–1 record, outscored opponents by a total of 258 to 63, and was recognized as the UPI College Division national champion. The team's only setback was an 8–6 loss to Memphis State. Harold Hays and Johnny Sklopan were the team captains. The team played its home games at Faulkner Field in Hattiesburg, Mississippi.

Schedule

References

Southern Miss
NCAA Small College Football Champions
Southern Miss Golden Eagles football seasons
Southern Miss Southerners football